Ondřej Palát (born 28 March 1991) is a Czech professional ice hockey winger and alternate captain for the New Jersey Devils of the National Hockey League (NHL). He was drafted in the seventh round, 208th overall, by the Tampa Bay Lightning at the 2011 NHL Entry Draft. Palát won back-to-back Stanley Cups with the Lightning in 2020 and 2021.

Playing career

Junior
Palát began his ice hockey career in his native Czech Republic with HC Frýdek-Místek. Prior to turning professional in North America, he played major junior hockey in the Quebec Major Junior Hockey League (QMJHL) with the Drummondville Voltigeurs. He was then selected by the Tampa Bay Lightning in the seventh round, 208th overall, of the 2011 NHL Entry Draft.

Professional

Tampa Bay Lightning
On 10 October 2011, the Lightning signed Palát to a three-year, entry-level contract. He then began his professional career with the Norfolk Admirals, Tampa Bay's American Hockey League (AHL) affiliate in the 2011–12 season. While a member of the Admirals, the club would set a professional hockey record by posting 28 consecutive wins. Norfolk would go on to capture the Calder Cup as AHL champions.

Palát played the next season in the AHL, 2012–13, with the Syracuse Crunch, Tampa Bay's new AHL affiliate. After a brief call-up to the NHL, he scored his first career NHL goal on 16 March 2013, against Justin Peters of the Carolina Hurricanes. Palát would later be returned to Syracuse for the 2013 Calder Cup playoffs. After reaching the Calder Cup Final, Palát and his teammates had the unique opportunity at back-to-back AHL championships, despite playing for two different hockey clubs. The Crunch, however, would fall to the Grand Rapids Griffins in the Final.

Palát would make the Lightning's 2013–14 opening roster out of training camp, along with his AHL line-mates Tyler Johnson and Richard Pánik. At the end of the season, he was nominated for the Calder Memorial Trophy, awarded to the NHL's rookie of the year, along with teammate Tyler Johnson. Palát, along with Johnson, became the first teammates to be nominated for the Trophy since Patrick Kane and Jonathan Toews of the Chicago Blackhawks in 2008. However, the Trophy eventually went to Nathan MacKinnon of the Colorado Avalanche, though Palát was named to the NHL All-Rookie Team.

On 9 June 2014, the Lightning announced that they had signed Palát to a three-year contract extension. He had 23 goals, 59 points and a +32 plus-minus rating in 81 games for the Lightning in 2013–14. He ranked second among all NHL rookies in points, and was third in goals scored. Additionally, Palát became the third Lightning player to finish a season with a plus-minus rating higher than +30.

On 14 July 2017, the Lightning announced that they had signed Palát to a five-year contract with an average annual value of $5.3 million. On 31 December 2017, Palát recorded his 162nd career assist in a 5–0 win over the Columbus Blue Jackets at Nationwide Arena. The assist moved Palát past Chris Gratton for tenth-most assists in franchise history.

On 23 November 2019, Palát recorded his 100th career NHL goal in a 6–2 Lightning win over the visiting Anaheim Ducks. On 25 November 2019, Palát recorded his 200th career NHL assist and 300th career NHL point in a 5–2 Lightning win over the visiting Buffalo Sabres. Palát was the eighth Lightning player to record 200 career assists and 10th Lightning player to record 300 career points. On August 31, 2020, Palát recorded a goal in his 4th consecutive playoff game. With this goal Palát joined Vincent Lecavalier, Martin St. Louis and Steven Stamkos as the only players in franchise history to record goals in 4 consecutive playoff games. On 7 September 2020, Palát recorded a goal in his fifth consecutive game to establish a new franchise playoff record. The goal came in an 8–2 Lightning win over the New York Islanders in the first game of the Eastern Conference final.

New Jersey Devils
Following his tenth season in the NHL with the Lightning, Palát left the club as a free agent due to salary cap constraints. On 14 July 2022, he was signed to a five-year, $30 million contract with the New Jersey Devils.

International play

On 6 January 2014, Palát played for the Czech Republic at the 2014 Winter Olympics in Sochi. The Czechs were eliminated by the United States. During his first Olympic appearance, Palát appeared in four games for his country; he did not register any points or penalty minutes in four games played.

On 2 March 2016, the Czech Ice Hockey Association named Palát to its roster for the 2016 World Cup of Hockey, alongside then-Lightning teammate Andrej Šustr. The tournament ran from 17 September to 1 October 2016 in Toronto.

Career statistics

Regular season and playoffs

International

Awards and honours

References

External links

from

1991 births
Living people
Czech expatriate ice hockey players in Canada
Czech expatriate ice hockey players in the United States
Czech ice hockey left wingers
Drummondville Voltigeurs players
Ice hockey players at the 2014 Winter Olympics
New Jersey Devils players
Norfolk Admirals players
Olympic ice hockey players of the Czech Republic
People from Frýdek-Místek
Sportspeople from the Moravian-Silesian Region
Stanley Cup champions
Syracuse Crunch players
Tampa Bay Lightning draft picks
Tampa Bay Lightning players